The Europe Zone was one of the two regional zones of the 1928 International Lawn Tennis Challenge.

27 teams entered the Europe Zone, with the winner going on to compete in the Inter-Zonal Final against the winner of the America Zone. Italy defeated Czechoslovakia in the final, and went on to face the United States in the Inter-Zonal Final.

Draw

First round

Romania vs. Belgium

Italy vs. Australia

Yugoslavia vs. Finland

Great Britain vs. Argentina

Germany vs. Greece

Spain vs. Chile

Poland vs. Denmark

Austria vs. Philippines

Norway vs. Hungary

Ireland vs. Netherlands

Second round

Switzerland vs. India

Italy vs. Romania

Finland vs. Great Britain

Germany vs. Spain

Denmark vs. Austria

Netherlands vs. Hungary

Sweden vs. Czechoslovakia

Portugal vs. New Zealand

Quarterfinals

Italy vs. India

Great Britain vs. Germany

Netherlands vs. Austria

Semifinals

Great Britain vs. Italy

Czechoslovakia vs. Netherlands

Final

Italy vs. Czechoslovakia

References

External links
Davis Cup official website

Davis Cup Europe/Africa Zone
Europe Zone
International Lawn Tennis Challenge